Hatnub was the location of Egyptian alabaster quarries and an associated seasonally occupied workers' settlement in the Eastern Desert, about  from el-Minya, southeast of el-Amarna. The pottery, hieroglyph inscriptions and hieratic graffiti at the site show that it was in use intermittently from at least as early as the reign of Khufu until the Roman period (c. 2589 BC–AD 300).  The Hatnub quarry settlement, associated with three principal quarries, like those associated with gold mines in the Wadi Hammamat and elsewhere, are characterized by drystone windbreaks, roads, causeways, cairns and stone alignments.

Hatnub was first described in modern times by Percy Newberry and Howard Carter in 1891. There are many inscriptions on the rocks, and these were first described by George Willoughby Fraser and Marcus Worsley Blackden, members of this same expedition. For nearly hundred years, archaeologists concentrated on finding and translating these inscriptions which illuminated much ordinary life in ancient Egypt. Only when Ian Shaw and his team began studying the material remains were the two integrated to give a fuller picture.

For example, no New Kingdom inscriptions were found, and it was thought that the quarries were not used during that period. Shaw and his team found New Kingdom pottery fragments showing that workers from this period must have used the quarries.

Ramp
In 2018, researchers from the University of Liverpool's Department of Archaeology, Classics and Egyptology (ACE) and the Institut Français d'Archéologie Orientale (IFAO) announced the discovery of an ancient ramp at the site. The well-preserved ramp, which dates to the reign of Khufu, may shed light on how his Great Pyramid was constructed.

Project co-director Yannis Gourdon from the IFAO says that "the system is composed of a central ramp flanked by two staircases with numerous post holes. Using a sled which carried a stone block and was attached with ropes to these wooden posts, ancient Egyptians were able to pull up the alabaster blocks out of the quarry on very steep slopes of 20 percent or more."

Bibliography 
R. Anthes, (1928) Die Felseninschriften von Hatnub", (UGAA 9) (Leipzig).
G.W. Fraser, (1894),  'Hat-Nub', PSBA16: 73-82.
T.G.H. James, (1991), 'The discovery and identification of the Alabaster Quarries of Hatnub' in Melanges Jacques Jean Clere CRIPEL 13.
I. Shaw, (1986), 'A survey at Hatnub', Amarna reports III, ed. B.J. Kemp (London), 189-212.
I. Shaw, (2010), Hatnub: Quarrying Travertine in Ancient Egypt, EES Excavation Memoir 88, (London)The Dictionary of Ancient Egypt,'' pg. 119-20

References

Geography of ancient Egypt
Quarries
Alabaster